Mickey the Kid is a 1939 American drama film directed by Arthur Lubin and starring Bruce Cabot, Ralph Byrd and ZaSu Pitts.  It was produced and distributed by Republic Pictures.

Plot
Dr. Ben Cameron is worried about 12-year-old Mickey, son of Jim Adams, a widower who leads a corrupt and complicated life. Jim rebuffs a request by Jim to have Mickey be raised by Veronica Hudson, the boy's maternal grandmother. Mickey idolizes his father and wants to remain with him.

Pulling a bank robbery, Jim shoots and kills an unarmed teller. While on the run from the law, he realizes Mickey would be better off with Veronica and leaves his son in her care. Veronica enrolls the boy in school. His teacher, Sheila Roberts, is engaged to marry Ben.

Jim sneaks into Veronica's house one night to see his son. He hides in the attic at night, then takes the boy along when he leaves. Desperate to get away, Jim hijacks a school bus filled with children. When the bus gets waylaid by a snowstorm, Jim abandons the kids and is unable to persuade Mickey to do the same. FBI agents shoot Jim, who realizes as he dies that Mickey's life will be better without him.

Cast
 Bruce Cabot as Jim Adams
 Jessie Ralph as Veronica
 Ralph Byrd as Ben
 ZaSu Pitts as Lilly
 June Storey as Sheila
 John Qualen as Mailman

Production
The film was known as Stand Up and Sing. It was based on the heroism of a school boy in a Colorado blizzard a few years previously. Cabot was cast in April. The title was changed in May. Filming started in May.

Reception
The Los Angeles Times called it "fairly good though slightly spotty."

Lubin considered the film "horrible" and said it was one of the eight flops in his career.

References

External links
Mickey the Kid at IMDb
Mickey the Kid at BFI
Mickey the Kid at Letterbox DVD
Mickey the Kid at TCMDB

1939 films
1939 drama films
Films directed by Arthur Lubin
American drama films
American black-and-white films
1930s English-language films
1930s American films
Republic Pictures films